KICK-FM (97.9 FM) is a radio station licensed to serve Palmyra, Missouri. The station is owned by Townsquare Media.

It broadcasts a country music format to the greater Quincy, Illinois, and Hannibal, Missouri, area. The station's studios are located in Quincy, Illinois.

See also
List of media outlets in Quincy, Illinois

References

External links

Country radio stations in the United States
ICK
Townsquare Media radio stations